The Academy: The First Riddle is a puzzle adventure game developed by Pine Studios and published by Snapbreak Games. It was released on June 19, 2020 for Microsoft Windows, macOS, iOS, and Android.

Reception
The game received mixed reviews, its PC version scoring 59 on Metacritic from an aggregate of 9 reviews. Peter Mattsson of Adventure Gamers gave it three stars out of five, citing awkward and limited puzzle mechanics but praising its visuals and duration. Pocket Gamer was similar in its verdict, praising its mysterious and vibrant setting, but criticized the controls and puzzles, also giving it three out of five stars. Shacknews gave it 6 out of 10, criticizing the characters and dialogue as unexciting.

References

2020 video games
Adventure games
Android (operating system) games
IOS games
MacOS games
Puzzle video games
School-themed video games
Video games developed in Croatia
Windows games